Edward Joseph Sedar (born August 8, 1961) is a former Major League Baseball advisor to the coaching staff for the Milwaukee Brewers. He previously served as the first base coach for the Brewers from 2007 to 2010 and third base coach from 2011 to 2020.

Biography
Ed Sedar played eight seasons as an outfielder in the Chicago White Sox organization after playing collegiate ball at College of Lake County. He later became a manager in the Brewers organization with the Ogden Raptors and Helena Brewers.

On October 25, 2021, Sedar announced his retirement from coaching.

References

External links

Retrosheet

1961 births
Living people
Sportspeople from Waukegan, Illinois
Baseball coaches from Illinois
Baseball players from Illinois
Major League Baseball first base coaches
Major League Baseball third base coaches
Milwaukee Brewers coaches
Minor league baseball managers
Niagara Falls Sox players
Glens Falls White Sox players
South Bend White Sox players
Appleton Foxes players
Daytona Beach Admirals players
Peninsula White Sox players